Daniel El(l)iot(t) may refer to:

Dan Elliott (musician) (late 20th. c.), American singer in The Monterays
Daniel Elliott (filmmaker) (early 21st. c.), winner of European Film Award for Best Short Film
Daniel Elliott (racing driver) (early 21st. c.), in Australian Formula Ford Championship
Daniel Giraud Elliot (1835–1915), American zoologist
Daniel Eliott (1798–1872), Scottish-Indian civil servant
Danny Elliott (footballer), English professional footballer
Daniel Elliott (Indiana politician), Indiana state representative
Daniel Elliott (Kentucky politician), Kentucky state representative
Daniel P. Elliott, an American drag performer also known as Bolivia Carmichaels

See also